Narammala(නාරම්මල) is a town in Kurunegala district, northwestern province, Sri Lanka.  It is connected to Sri Lankan transport network by Kurunegala-Colombo 5 road and Kurunegala-Negombo 34 road. Narammala is 74 km (45.98 Miles) away from Colombo and 18 km (11.18 Miles) away from Kurunegala. This beautiful town is surrounded by blocks of Paddy fields and Coconut estates. Narammala is where the world's first and only betel research lab and institute is situated. It is situated at Dampalassa where is 3.5km far from Narammala town towards to Giriulla.

People
Most people in Narammala town are Sinhalese and Muslims while most of the surrounding areas are inhabited by Sinhalese. People here use paddy cultivation as their major source of food. Narammala as the major town, fulfills needs of thousands of people living in small villages around it and so it's commercially and socially important.

Details
Geographical coordinates of Narammala are 7°26'1563" North, 80°13'797" East.

Postal Code is 60100.

History 
In accordance to legends, history of Narammala starts when the Kingdom of Dambadeniya was established by King Vijayabahu III (1220AD-1236AD). After leaving the Kingdom of Polonnaruwa as a safety measurement for the kingdom and the Temple of the Tooth, King Vijayabahu III shifted to Dambadeniya. Since those days the name Narammala exists. According to history, as soon as kingdom of Dambadeniya was established the sacred tooth relic of Gautama Buddha was brought. On the way it was brought, the King offered a golden Naa [Ceylon Ironwood or rose chestnut (Mesua ferrea)] flower at the place which today is known as Narammala. In Sinhala, golden Naa flower is called RAN+NA+MALA(රන්+නා+මල), which then turned into NA+RAN+MALA(නා+රන්+මල) for the ease of pronunciation. Hence the name; Narammala.

Map of Narammala
http://www.maplandia.com/sri-lanka/north-western/narammala/

References

External links
http://mohanjith.net/postal_codes/north-western/kurunegala/60100-narammala.html
http://srilanka.lankatopten.com/north_western_province/kurunegala_district/narammala/
http://lankanbusiness.com/narammala-divisional-secretariat-9242.html
https://web.archive.org/web/20181126223118/http://www.lankalibrary.com/phpBB/viewtopic.php?f=38&t=4569

Populated places in Kurunegala District
Grama Niladhari divisions of Sri Lanka